Vincenty may refer to:

 Thaddeus Vincenty (1920-2002), Polish-American geodesist
 Vincenty's formulae, a fast algorithm to calculate the distance between two latitude/longitude points